Safsar (also Romanized as Şafsar, Sefaser, and Şaf-e Sar; also known as Şafat Sar and Şafḩ Sar) is a village in Pasikhan Rural District, in the Central District of Rasht County, Gilan Province, Iran. At the 2006 census, its population was 835 with 213 families.

References 

Populated places in Rasht County